The Sebeș is a left tributary of the river Sovata in Romania. It discharges into the Sovata in the town Sovata.

References

Rivers of Romania
Rivers of Mureș County